Nærøy is a former municipality in Trøndelag county, Norway. The municipality existed from 1838 until its dissolution in 2020 when it joined Nærøysund Municipality. It was part of the Namdalen region.  Norway's smallest town, Kolvereid, was the administrative centre of the municipality.  Some villages in Nærøy included Abelvær, Foldereid, Gravvik, Lund, Ottersøy, Salsbruket, Steine, and Torstad.

At the time of its dissolution in 2020, the  municipality was the 96th largest by area out of the 422 municipalities in Norway. Nærøy was the 200th most populous municipality in Norway with a population of 5,117.

General information
Nærøy was established as a municipality on 1 January 1838 (see formannskapsdistrikt).  On 1 July 1869, the western island district was separated from Nærøy to become the new municipality of Vikten.  This left Nærøy with 1,477 residents.  On 1 January 1902, an unpopulated area of Kolvereid was transferred to Nærøy municipality.

During the 1960s, there were many municipal mergers across Norway due to the work of the Schei Committee.  On 1 January 1964, the neighboring municipalities of Kolvereid (population: 2,426), Nærøy (population: 2,182), Gravvik (population: 816), and the western two-thirds of Foldereid were merged to form the new, larger municipality of Nærøy.

On 1 January 2018, the municipality of Nærøy switched from the old Nord-Trøndelag county to the new Trøndelag county.

On 1 January 2020, the municipality of Nærøy was merged with most of the neighboring municipality of Vikna to form the new Nærøysund Municipality. The Lund area in Nærøy was not part of the merger. It became part of the newly enlarged Namsos Municipality on the same date.

Name
The municipality (originally the parish) is named after the island of Nærøya since the Old Nærøy Church was built there. The first element is maybe the stem form of the name of the Norse god Njord (but it is suspicious that it is not in the genitive case). Historically, the name has had varying spellings such as Nærø or Nærøen.

Coat of arms
The coat of arms was granted on 22 May 1987 and they were in use until 1 January 2020 when the municipality was dissolved. The official blazon is "Or, three fleur-de-lis in pall stems conjoined gules". This means the arms have a field (background) that has a tincture of Or which means it is commonly colored yellow, but if it is made out of metal, then gold is used. The charge is three conjoined fleur-de-lis aligned in a Y-shaped design. The fleur-de-lis design is red to symbolize the local water lilies which generally have a reddish color. The arms are also based on the seal of King Håkon Magnusson from 1344, on a document in which the King granted several rights to the local farmers. The seal shows St. Mary in a portal decorated with fleur-de-lis, the symbol of St. Mary. The arms were designed by Einar H. Skjervold. The municipal flag has the same design as the coat of arms.

Churches
The Church of Norway had four parishes within the municipality of Nærøy.  It is part of the Namdal prosti (deanery) in the Diocese of Nidaros.

Geography
The municipality was located in the northwestern part of Trøndelag county, along the Foldafjord.  It included the islands of Austra and Gjerdinga and the Kvingra peninsula.  Several large lakes were located in the municipality including Mjosundvatnet, Salvatnet, and Storvatnet.

Government
While it existed, this municipality was responsible for primary education (through 10th grade), outpatient health services, senior citizen services, unemployment and other social services, zoning, economic development, and municipal roads. During its existence, this municipality was governed by a municipal council of elected representatives, which in turn elected a mayor. The municipality fell under the Namdal District Court and the Frostating Court of Appeal.

Municipal council
The municipal council of Nærøy is made up of 27 representatives that are elected to four year terms.  The party breakdown of the final municipal council was as follows:

Mayors
The mayors of Nærøy:

1837–1839: Paul Anzjøn
1840–1841: Knud Grimstad
1842–1843: Lorns H. Lyngsnes
1844–1847: Gerhard Willemsen Iversen
1848–1849: Matheus Anzjøn 	
1850–1851: Conrad M. Anzjøn
1852–1855: Christian Sverdrup
1856–1857: Arendt Lund
1858–1859: Fredrik Jensen Storval
1860–1861: Conrad M. Anzjøn
1862–1863: Ole Thomassen Thorland
1864–1865: Fredrik Jensen Storval
1866–1868: Peder C. Lund
1869–1871: Christian Sverdrup
1872–1873: Ole Thomassen Thorland
1874–1875: Peter Andreas Strand
1876–1879: Peter Olaus Varø
1880–1883: Johan Pedersen Laugen (V)
1884–1885: Bernt O. Søraa
1886–1889: Johan Pedersen Laugen (V)
1890–1891: Johan Eliassen Storvedde (V)
1892–1895: Georg Brandtzæg (H)
1896–1897: Nils Halvorsen Sandnes (H)
1898–1904: Georg Nordrum (H)
1905-1905: Nils Halvorsen Sandnes (H)
1905–1916: Nils Christian Brandtzæg (H)
1917–1919: Julian Knotten (V)
1920–1922: Nils Christian Brandtzæg (H)
1923–1928: Axel Sund (V)
1929–1940: Olav Bog (V)
1941–1943: Jens Christian Williksen (NS)
1943–1945: Meier Jensen (NS)
1945-1945: Olav Bog (V)
1946–1947: Jens Folkestad (Bp)
1948–1951: Martin Strandvahl (V)
1952–1955: Haakon Sandnes (Bp)
1956–1957: Martin Strandvahl (V)
1958-1958: Arnvid Førde (Bp)
1959–1961: Kåre Hildrum (Bp)
1962–1967: Arne Løvmo (V)
1968–1969: Birger Øverås (Sp)
1970–1971: Ebbe Skillingstad (Sp)
1972–1975: Arne Ness (Ap)
1976–1979: Kåre Aarmo (KrF)
1980–1983: Odd Bach (Sp)
1984–1989: Åsmund Rønningen (Ap)
1990–1998: Hans Mo (Sp)
1998–2019: Steinar Aspli (Sp)
2019-present: Rune Arstein (H)

Transportation
Norwegian County Road 17 crosses the northeastern part of the municipality.  There is a large network of bridges in the municipality that connect islands and cross fjords.  Most notably is the Marøysund Bridge and Nærøysund Bridge which connect Nærøy to Vikna to the west. Also Hestøy Bridge and Smines Bridge connect the village of Lund to Fosnes municipality to the south.

Media gallery

See also
Hundhammerfjellet wind farm
List of former municipalities of Norway

References

External links

Municipal fact sheet from Statistics Norway 

 
Nærøysund
Former municipalities of Norway
1838 establishments in Norway
2020 disestablishments in Norway
Populated places disestablished in 2020